Raymond Bellot (9 June 1929 – 24 February 2019) was a French footballer. He was part of the French squad which finished third at the 1958 FIFA World Cup, but he never won a cap for the France national football team.

Club career
 1955–1958: AS Monaco FC

References

1929 births
2019 deaths
French footballers
1958 FIFA World Cup players
Racing Club de France Football players
AS Monaco FC players
Stade Français (association football) players
Ligue 1 players
Association football forwards
People from Alfortville
Footballers from Val-de-Marne